Otago Polytechnic Students' Association is an independent organisation founded in the 1960s for Otago Polytechnic students, and is the sole students' association at OP.

OPSA's aims include:
 Promoting and supplying services, facilities, support and amenities for students.
 Working towards removing barriers to education.
 Representing the needs and aspirations of students; promoting the advancement of education.

Facilities and services
OPSA provides access to many facilities and services like the student ID card, Clubs & Societies Centre, a second-hand bookshop, UNIPOL Sports Centre, a digital student newsletter/paper (StudentNews), free pool tables, free campus telephones, the Student Discount Directory, social events, and Student Job Search.

Student support
OPSA also provides support services like advocacy, campaigns, representation, financial assistance, and advice. OPSA is often involved with local authorities representing a student view, especially in transportation and housing issues.

Education campaign
OPSA advocates everyone's right to tertiary education, and that user-pays education creates a significant barrier to this right. OPSA seeks a return to free tertiary education as it was before 1989.

Structure
OPSA is governed by an annually elected body of students, and runs a class-representatives network.
2014 President: Rebecca Swindells (née Hohaia)

History
OPSA was created two years before the 1966 opening of Otago Polytechnic. King Edward Technical College set up the Polytechnic Full-time Students’ Association in 1964 to organise social and sporting activities for full-time tertiary students in anticipation of King Edward Technical's split into Otago Polytechnic and Logan Park High School. Membership was initially compulsory for all full-time students.

The Association's name was changed to the Otago Polytechnic Students’ Association in 1968. OPSA became an incorporated society in 1976, officially a not-profit making organisation in 1986, and was awarded charitable status in 1994.

OPSA was a founding member of NZTISA, the national student body of polytechnics and technical institutions, in 1971. During the 1970s OPSA expanded into the role of student representation and campaigning for student rights.

Recent events
Since 2011 membership of New Zealand students' associations was made voluntary by the government, at Otago Polytechnic any enrolled OP student may consider themselves a member. OPSA's income is largely from a service contract with the Polytechnic.

OPSA campaigned against the Government's removal of student representation from polytechnic councils in 2009.

In 2008 and 2009 OPSA took the unusual move of threatening to expel any members involved in illegal violence at the Undie 500.

References

External links
 OPSA's official site has comprehensive info about OPSA including a social events calendar, student services, news, and media releases, etc.
 StudentNews student magazine
 Otago Polytechnic site
 UNIPOL Sports Centre
 Clubs & Societies centre
 Student Job Search
 NZUSA is the national student body OPSA has been a member of.

Students' associations in New Zealand
Otago Polytechnic